Interstate 670 may refer to:
Interstate 670 (Kansas–Missouri), a connector highway within Kansas City
Interstate 670 (Ohio), a spur highway connecting Columbus, Ohio, to Gahanna, Ohio

70-6
6